Arrange the Molecule is the tenth studio album by Mentallo & The Fixer, released on October 13, 2017 by Alfa Matrix.

Reception
In reviewing Arrange the Molecule, ReGen praised Mentallo & The Fixer for "bypassing the group's prior sounds for something more experimental with complicated programming and an absence of song structure." Terrorverlag praised the compositions for comprising an array of sounds that defy description and compared the band favorably Skinny Puppy, Download and Uwe Schmidt.

Track listing

Personnel
Adapted from the Arrange the Molecule liner notes.

Mentallo & The Fixer
 Gary Dassing (as Mentallo) – programming, engineering, mixing, mastering, illustrations

Production and design
 Benoît Blanchart – design

Release history

References

External links 
 
 Arrange the Molecule at Bandcamp
 Arrange the Molecule at iTunes

2017 albums
Mentallo & The Fixer albums
Alfa Matrix albums